Alfredo Romero Mendoza (born 7 January 1969) is a Venezuelan lawyer, human rights activist and executive director of the non-governmental organization Foro Penal. He received the Robert F. Kennedy Human Rights Award in 2017.

Career 
Alfredo Romero graduated as a lawyer in the Andrés Bello Catholic University in 1991, received a master's degree in Latin American studies in Georgetown University in 1994 and afterwards a master's degree in financial public law in the University of London in 1997. Between 2001 and 2002 he was rapporteur of the Constitutional Chamber of the Supreme Tribunal of Justice and in 2002 he founded the civil association VIVE (Victims of Violence in Violation of Human Rights), representing the victims of the April 11, 2002 Llaguno Overpass events. This firm later merged with the non-governmental organization Foro Penal.

Romero has been awarded several recognitions for his work in human rights. He has been member of the Global Agenda Council in rule of law in the World Economic Forum, and in 2007 he was recognized as a "World Young Leader" by the Forum. In 2009 Romero received the honour diploma from the Venezuelan Lawyers Association as recognition for his effort to improve judicial institutions and recognition as public servant by Rotary International. In 2014 he was awarded the Bicentennial Order by the National Lawyers Association, the highest recognition of that institution in the country. Romero was named as the 2017 Robert F. Kennedy Human Rights Award laureate, an award given to individuals around the world "who show courage and have made a significant contribution to human rights in their country."

He has also worked as law professor in the Central University of Venezuela and the Andrés Bello Catholic University, is member of the Himiob Romero law firm and currently is executive director of Foro Penal, as well as member of the Harvard Kennedy School Carr Center for Human Rights Policy.

Romero is the author of the book Relatos de muerte en vivo. Also, he is co-author of the book Crímenes de Lesa Humanidad, una perspectiva venezolana.

See also 
 Gonzalo Himiob
 Carlos Correa
 Liliana Ortega
 Rocío San Miguel

References 

Living people
1969 births
Georgetown University alumni
Academic staff of Andrés Bello Catholic University
Academic staff of the Central University of Venezuela
Andrés Bello Catholic University alumni
Venezuelan human rights activists
20th-century Venezuelan lawyers
People from Caracas
Robert F. Kennedy Human Rights Award laureates
21st-century Venezuelan lawyers